Sulphur is an unincorporated community in Trinity County, Texas, United States.

References

Unincorporated communities in Trinity County, Texas
Unincorporated communities in Texas